Idalus delicata is a moth of the family Erebidae. It was described by Heinrich Benno Möschler in 1886. It is found on Jamaica.

References

delicata
Moths described in 1886